Pimba is a Portuguese type or genre of music with an uptempo style and folk song features, corny romantic or saucy and vulgar lyrics, which was often associated with poorly educated public from rural areas or suburban poor neighbourhoods. The Portuguese word pimba by itself means a quick, unexpected event or the end of an action, and is also a slang code word for having any type of sexual pleasure with another person. A loose translation could be the English word bang when used to express an act of sexual intercourse or the expression "wham!". In the context of Portuguese music, the genre was christened Pimba after Emanuel’s 1995 single called Pimba Pimba.

History
The genre began to have a greater popularity in the 1980s and reached its apogee in the 1990s. Pimba bands and musicians or singers are influenced by the rural areas of the Portuguese countryside and the economic emigration phenomenon which was common place in Portuguese life and the society throughout the 20th century. The Pimba genre is characterized by humorous lyrics, usually charged with sexual metaphors (like Rosinha’s songs), but it can also be used to refer to singers of overly sentimental lyrics (such as Tony Carreira and Ágata) who play in local festivities across the country, usually during the Summer season. At the onset and for many years, Pimba music and musicians or bands were object of negative criticism by some music erudites and cultural authorities, although being often much more popular and profitable across Portugal and the Portuguese expat communities abroad than other more reputable genres. The origins of Pimba as a genre are hard to define with precision, but Portuguese singer Emanuel’s 1995 single called Pimba Pimba is regarded as a milestone in the genre’s popularity explosion even after Quim Barreiros’ 1991 and 1992 songs Bacalhau à Portuguesa (O Bacalhau Quer Alho) and O Sorveteiro (Chupa Teresa) have reached such a huge success that the genre started to be widely sought-after and appreciated nationwide by then, although still just known as Portuguese folk music instead of Pimba music. Always present in local festivities and holidays of villages and towns across the entire country, that are often connected with religious holidays in honor of a patron saint of a local community, almost always in the Summer, Pimba singers also became a must in several major university and college festivals or festivities, such as the Queima das Fitas.

See also 
Schlager
Turbo-Folk

References

Further reading
Marques, Francisco, "A música Pimba - Um fenómeno musical", ed. Sete Caminhos

 
Portuguese styles of music
Musical subcultures
Portuguese words and phrases